The 2012 Algarve Cup was the nineteenth edition of the Algarve Cup, an invitational women's football tournament held annually in Portugal. It began on 29 February and ended on 7 March 2012.

Format
The twelve invited teams were split into three groups that played a round-robin tournament.

Groups A and B, containing the strongest ranked teams, were the only ones in contention to win the title. The group winners from A and B contested the final, with the runners-up playing for third place and those that finished third in these two groups playing for fifth place.

The teams in Group C were playing for places 7–12, with the winner of Group C playing the team that finished fourth in Group A or B with the better record for seventh place and the Group C runner-up playing the team which came last in Group A or B with the worse record for ninth place. The third and fourth-placed teams in Group C played for the eleventh place.

Points awarded in the group stage followed the standard formula of three points for a win, one point for a draw and zero points for a loss. In the case of two teams being tied on the same number of points in a group, their head-to-head result determined the higher place.

Teams
Listed are the confirmed teams.

Match officials

Squads

Group stage
All times are local (WET/UTC+0).

Group A

Group B

Group C

Placement play-offs

Eleventh place match

Ninth place match

Seventh place match

Fifth place match

Third place match

Final

Goalscorers
6 goals
 Célia Okoyino da Mbabi

5 goals
 Alex Morgan

3 goals
 Cecilie Pedersen
 Ana Borges
 Antonia Göransson
 Abby Wambach

2 goals

 Johanna Rasmussen
 Sanne Troelsgaard Nielsen
 Nahomi Kawasumi
 Yūki Nagasato
 Sydney Leroux
 Helen Lander

1 goal

 Ma Xiaoxu
 Melanie Behringer
 Dzsenifer Marozsán
 Anja Mittag
 Alexandra Popp
 Lilla Sipos
 Szabina Tálosi
 Fanny Vágó
 Áine O'Gorman
 Louise Quinn
 Julie-Ann Russell
 Fanndís Friðriksdóttir
 Dóra María Lárusdóttir
 Hólmfríður Magnúsdóttir
 Isabell Herlovsen
 Elise Thorsnes
 Shinobu Ohno
 Yuika Sugasawa
 Megumi Takase
 Asuna Tanaka
 Carla Couto
 Carolina Mendes
 Andrea Rodrigues
 Jessica Landström
 Lotta Schelin
 Carli Lloyd
 Angharad James

Final standings

References

External links
Algarve Cup 2012 on WomensSoccerUnited.com
Algarve Cup 2012 on frauenfussball-info.de

 
2012
2012 in women's association football
2011–12 in Portuguese football
February 2012 sports events in Europe
March 2012 sports events in Europe
2012 in Portuguese women's sport